Jolijn is a feminine Dutch given name. Notable people with the name include:

Jolijn van de Wiel (born 1992), Dutch actress
Jolijn van Valkengoed (born 1981), Dutch swimmer

Dutch feminine given names